Seal Glacier is a small glacier draining east, located just north of Parrish Peak in the Enterprise Hills, Heritage Range. Mapped by United States Geological Survey (USGS) from surveys and U.S. Navy air photos, 1961–66. Named by Advisory Committee on Antarctic Names (US-ACAN) for radioman G.L. Seal, U.S. Navy, who up to Operation Deepfreeze 1966 had contributed to efficient communications during four austral summer seasons.

See also
 List of glaciers in the Antarctic
 Glaciology

References

 

Glaciers of Ellsworth Land